The Masquers Playhouse (formerly the Point Richmond Village Playhouse) is an 89-seat community theatre in Point Richmond in Contra Costa County, California.

It is home to the Masquers, a local performing group that has been in production since 1955.  Their first play at the playhouse was The Happiest Millionaire in March 1960.

The theatre has been presented with honors and recognition from various members of Congress, state legislature, and other politicians.

In March 2016 the theatre, then about 110 years old, had to close due to structural problems, but the Masquers continued to stage performances in various nearby venues and held fundraising events to pay for repairs and renovations (seismic retrofitting and wheelchair accessibility).

As of June 2020, repairs were expected to be complete by September (along with a newly remodeled lobby and restrooms).

Notes

External links

 The Masquers Playhouse official website

Buildings and structures in Richmond, California
Tourist attractions in Richmond, California
Theatre in the San Francisco Bay Area